The 1999 CECAFA Cup was the 23rd edition of the tournament. It was held in Rwanda, and was won by Rwanda B team. The matches were played between July 24–August 7.

Rwanda sent two teams: Rwanda A and Rwanda B.

Group stage

Group A

Group B

Group C

Group D

Rwanda B finished second on coin toss.

Knockout stage

Quarter-finals

Semi-final

Third place match

Final

References
RSSSF archives

CECAFA Cup
International association football competitions hosted by Rwanda
1999 in Rwandan sport